Joan Gould (February 27, 1927 – August 20, 2022) was an American author and journalist. As a freelance journalist in the 1960s, Gould contributed articles to publications such as Esquire Life, Sports Illustrated, McCall's and The New York Times. She helped to plan and was the inaugural columnist of the Times "Hers" column, for "intelligent, involved women".

Her first book, Otherborn (1980), was a science fiction novel for young adults. She has also published Spirals: A Woman's Journey Through Family Life (1988) and Spinning Straw into Gold: What Fairy Tales Reveal About the Transformations in a Woman's Life (2005).

Writing
After attending Bryn Mawr College where she studied with W. H. Auden, she worked as a freelance journalist in the 1960s, contributing articles to a variety of publications. Most notably, she wrote about boat racing for Esquire.

In 1980, Gould wrote her first book, Otherborn, a science fiction novel for young adults. The book follows a shipwrecked brother and sister who are stranded on a Pacific Island inhabited by an unusual race of people.

In 1976, at a Manhattan party, Gould suggested the idea of a column for "intelligent, involved women" to A. M. Rosenthal, editor of The New York Times. With Gould's assistance, Rosenthal developed the New York Times "Hers" column, "designed as a forum for writing by women."
Gould became its first columnist.

Her pieces focus on the unique relational roles women play in the lives of their families and friends. She draws from her own experiences as a widow navigating the world without her longtime partner. An avid sailor, Gould also wrote about finding her sense of self on the open water: "For a while, a boat is more than a boat, and I am more than a blunderer. I am myself."

Gould chronicles her husband's illness and subsequent death from cancer in her 1988 book, Spirals: A Woman's Journey Through Family Life. Gould writes about her evolving roles and responsibilities as her husband dies and as her children grow up:

Gould's travel writing has also been featured in the NY Times travel section. Some of her work was included in Katharine Lee Bates collection Spain: The Best Travel Writing from the New York Times (2001).

In 2005, Random House published Gould's feminist examination of cultural lore, Spinning Straw into Gold: What Fairy Tales Reveal About the Transformations in a Woman's Life.

Critical response
Gould's memoir, Spirals, received a rave review in The New York Times. The reviewer, Bob Greene, called the book "unlike anything I have ever read before," and praised its honest representation of life's banalities:

Spirals was selected a New York Times Editor's Choice the week of July 24, 1988.

Personal life
After graduating, she married Martin Kleinbard, a lawyer. They were married for twenty-eight years, until his death from cancer in 1978. They had three children. Their marriage and family life serves as the inspiration for much of her writing.

Gould died in Rye, New York on August 20, 2022, aged 95.

Select works

 "The Fastest, Smoothest Boat Yet," Esquire (February 1966)
 "An Aquarium for the People," Esquire (July 1966)
 "Nine Intrepid Men," Esquire (April 1, 1967)
 Otherborn (1980)
 Spirals: A Woman's Journey Through Family Life (1988)
 "Musings from the Underworld," New York Times, January 31, 1993
 "By Copter to the Wilds of Canada," New York Times, July 2, 1996
 Spinning Straw Into Gold: What Fairy Tales Reveal About the Transformations in a Woman's Life (2005)

References 

1927 births
2022 deaths
American women novelists
Journalists from New York City
American science fiction writers
Bryn Mawr College alumni
American feminist writers
The New York Times columnists
American women columnists
20th-century American women writers
21st-century American women writers